Ward Hayes Wilson (born April 26, 1956) is a Senior Fellow and director of the Rethinking Nuclear Weapons project at the British American Security Information Council (BASIC), a think tank focusing on nuclear disarmament based in London and Washington, D.C. He lives and works in Trenton, New Jersey.

Career 
Although Wilson was not widely published in the nuclear weapons field until 2007, he has quickly moved into “the forefront” of the debate about the value and utility of nuclear weapons and deterrence. He is one of five co-authors of a 2010 report sponsored by the Swiss government titled “Devaluing Nuclear Weapons,”

Wilson is best known for his argument that the atomic bombings of Hiroshima and Nagasaki did not force Japan's surrender; a prevalent argument which some have recently come to challenge.

Wilson was awarded the top prize ($10,000) in the Doreen and Jim McElvany Nonproliferation Challenge in 2008 for his “impressive and detailed critique of nuclear deterrence.” He received a substantial grant the following year to write, travel, and speak on nuclear weapons issues.
Traveling extensively over the last four years, he has presented arguments that challenge accepted ideas about nuclear weapons before government and public audiences on six continents. Wilson has spoken at the State Department, the Pentagon, the U.K. House of Commons, the European Parliament, the Brookings Institution, the Center for Strategic and International Studies, Naval War College, and universities including Harvard, Princeton, Stanford, Georgetown, and University of Chicago. Wilson launched his book, Five Myths About Nuclear Weapons, at the United Nations Office for Disarmament Affairs in February 2013.

Awards and honors
RFK Fellow, The Robert Kennedy Memorial Foundation, 1981.
Doreen and Jim McElvaney Prize, 2008. A $10,000 for the best essay on nuclear weapons worldwide in 2008.

Works 
Five Myths About Nuclear Weapons, Houghton Mifflin Harcourt, 2013. Review.
In addition to the Five Myths About Nuclear Weapons book, Wilson is an avid writer of op-eds, journal articles, reports, and briefing papers.
"Strengthening Nonproliferation", British American Security Information Council, October 2013
"Rethinking the Utility of Nuclear Weapons,” Parameters, 2013.
"Myth of Nuclear Necessity," op-ed, The New York Times, January 13, 2013.
“The Myth of Nuclear Deterrence,” Nonproliferation Review, 2008.
“The Winning Weapon? Rethinking Nuclear Weapons in Light of Hiroshima,” International Security, 2007.

See also

Doomsday Clock

References

External links
Ward Wilson, Bulletin of the Atomic Scientists
Ward Wilson, author of “Five Myths About Nuclear Weapons” presents his book at the United Nations, UNODA
Interview with Ward Wilson, author, “5 Myths of Nuclear Weapons”, July 22, 2019
RealistRevolt, a project by Ward Wilson

Living people
Arms control people
1956 births